Qualification for the 2000 AFC U-16 Championship.

Group 1 
All matches played in Muscat, Oman.

Group 2 
All matches played in Bahrain.

Group 3
All matches played in Tehran, Iran.

Group 4
All matches played in Calcutta, India.

Group 5
All matches played in Kathmandu, Nepal.

Group 6
All matches played in Bangkok, Thailand.

Group 7
All matches played in Seoul, South Korea.

Group 8
All matches played in Nagoya, Japan.

Group 9
All matches played in Yangon, Myanmar.

Qualified teams 

 (host)

References
 RSSSF Archive

Qual
AFC U-16 Championship qualification